The Songa Mercur is a semi-submersible drilling rig designed by Friede & Goldman, ex Shelf 10 and La Muralla.

In May 2006, Songa Offshore signed a nine-month contract with Chevron to use the rig in Australia. A contract was later signed with Santos Limited, which was originally nine months and was extended to a year and then a year and a half.  In 2013, the rig was contracted by Idemitsu Oil and Gas for drilling off Vietnam.

In 2014, Songa Offshore sold the rig to Opus Offshore as a part of the deal creating Songa-Opus joint venture.

See also
 Semi-submersible
 Semi-submersible Platform
 drilling platform

References

External links
 Songa Mercur official executive summary (PDF)
 Virtual tour:  

1990 ships
Drilling rigs
Semi-submersibles
Ships built in the Soviet Union
Ships of the Marshall Islands